Aspergillus petrakii is a species of fungus in the genus Aspergillus.  It is from the Circumdati section. The species was first described in 1957.

Growth and morphology

A. petrakii has been cultivated on both Czapek yeast extract agar (CYA) plates and Malt Extract Agar Oxoid® (MEAOX) plates. The growth morphology of the colonies can be seen in the pictures below.

References 

petrakii
Fungi described in 1957